Philipp Mohr is an American architect, artist, author, and industrial designer.

He's known for designing celebrity homes such as the New York apartment of German film director Tom Tykwer. In collaboration with other designers, he created several acclaimed industrial design and art objects. He studied architecture and fine arts at the Bauhaus University Weimar, Polytecnic University Milano and Cooper Union. In 2000 Mohr designed the Metaring, a computer-generated and machine-milled piece of jewelry. In 2004, he collaborated with Tobi Wong on a series of diamond clad industrial designs. Mohr participated in the 2004 group show at Terminal 5 (exhibition) together with Tobias Wong and their Diamond Project, the Killer Ring, Dimemond, Hidden Diamond Ring and Diamond Skull were featured in that exhibition. 
In collaboration with design partner Ju$t Another Rich Kid, he created a series of conceptual jewelry. In 2013 Mohr collaborated with John Erik Karkula and designed the acclaimed furniture showroom in Williamsburg, Brooklyn. In 2018 Philipp Mohr Design Studio received a Dezeen Awards nomination for the renovation of a Le Corbusier apartment in Berlin. The renovation was a first realization of Le Corbusier’s design according to original plans.

References

External links
 p. 160
 Mohr,Philipp,Café Corbusier – eine Rekonstruktion in Berlin,edition Kronzeugen,Rauderfehn,2021
 p. 171

Living people
1972 births
20th-century American architects
American industrial designers
20th-century German artists
20th-century German architects
Polytechnic University of Milan alumni
German industrial designers
Artists from New York City
American LGBT artists